Macau competed in the 2009 East Asian Games which were held in Hong Kong, China from December 5, 2009 to December 13, 2009. Macau finished sixth on the medal table with 8 gold medals.

References

2009 East Asian Games
Macau at the East Asian Games
2009 in Macau sport